Victor Henry Wallenberg (12 November 1875 – 3 November 1970) was a Swedish sport shooter who competed in the 1912 Summer Olympics. In 1912 he was part of the Swedish team which finished fourth in the team clay pigeons event. In the individual trap competition he finished 34th. Son of banker André Oscar Wallenberg.

See also
 Wallenberg family

References

1875 births
1970 deaths
Swedish male sport shooters
Trap and double trap shooters
Olympic shooters of Sweden
Shooters at the 1912 Summer Olympics
Victor Wallenberg